Featherston (Māori: Paetūmōkai) is a town in the South Wairarapa District, in the Wellington Region of New Zealand's North Island.

The town has a population of  Featherston has increasingly become a satellite town of Wellington since the Remutaka rail tunnel opened in 1955; at the 2006 census, 36% of employed Featherston residents worked in Wellington and the Hutt Valley. This proximity to the capital, coupled with low house prices, made Featherston popular with writers, artists and those with young families, in turn leading to a recent upsurge in business investment and creative activity. From 2014 to 2019, housing prices in Featherston increased by 108% while rental prices went from an average of $140 to $400 in the same time period.

History
Wairarapa Moana (Lake Wairarapa) was among the first areas settled in New Zealand with sites dating back some 800 years.  Fish and waterfowl were plentiful, but the major draw card was tuna – the native freshwater eel.  Tuna could be caught in vast quantities during their seasonal migration to the sea, and the catch could be dried for storage or trading.  Seasonal eeling settlements dotted the edge of Wairarapa Moana with several permanent settlements on the surrounding higher ground.

The town of Featherston was first known as Burlings, after Henry Burling, who opened an accommodation house near the Māori settlement of Pae-O-Tu-Mokai in 1847. In 1856 the provincial government surveyed the spot for a town, naming it after its superintendent, Isaac Featherston.

The Featherston Military Camp was a major training camp in World War I, established in 1916 and housing up to 8000 men. The camp was larger than the town and included 16 dining halls, six cookhouses, 17 shops, a picture theatre, hospital, and post office. After training, infantrymen marched over the Remutaka Range for embarkation at Wellington.

During World War II, in 1942 it became the Featherston prisoner of war camp, holding 800 Japanese POWs captured in the South Pacific. On 25 February 1943 an incident occurred where 122 Japanese Prisoners of War in the camp were shot (48 dead, 74 wounded). Tension had been building for weeks before a group of recently arrived prisoners staged a sit-down strike and refused to work. Guards fired a warning shot, wounding Lieutenant Adachi Toshio. The prisoners then rose and the guards opened fire. Wartime censors kept details of the incident quiet to prevent Japanese reprisals against Allied POWs. After the war, the first POW to return to Featherston burned incense at the site in 1974 and a joint New Zealand–Japanese project established a memorial ground, located 2 km north of the town on State Highway 2.

Featherston houses the world's only surviving Fell locomotive engine in the Fell Engine Museum. The locomotive system operated successfully for 77 years from 1878 to 1955. Remnants of the trains and the once busy settlement are visible on the Remutaka Rail Trail Cycleway.

Before 1989 Featherston was the namesake of Featherston County. It also had its own borough giving it a borough council and mayor.

Demographics 

Featherston had a population of 2,487 at the 2018 New Zealand census, an increase of 237 people (10.5%) since the 2013 census, and an increase of 144 people (6.1%) since the 2006 census. There were 1,035 households. There were 1,254 males and 1,233 females, giving a sex ratio of 1.02 males per female. The median age was 43.8 years (compared with 37.4 years nationally), with 471 people (18.9%) aged under 15 years, 339 (13.6%) aged 15 to 29, 1,200 (48.3%) aged 30 to 64, and 480 (19.3%) aged 65 or older.

Ethnicities were 88.9% European/Pākehā, 19.7% Māori, 2.8% Pacific peoples, 3.0% Asian, and 2.2% other ethnicities (totals add to more than 100% since people could identify with multiple ethnicities).

The proportion of people born overseas was 16.2%, compared with 27.1% nationally.

Although some people objected to giving their religion, 56.9% had no religion, 29.1% were Christian, 0.5% were Hindu, 0.1% were Muslim, 0.2% were Buddhist and 3.7% had other religions.

Of those at least 15 years old, 384 (19.0%) people had a bachelor or higher degree, and 483 (24.0%) people had no formal qualifications. The median income was $25,600, compared with $31,800 nationally. The employment status of those at least 15 was that 924 (45.8%) people were employed full-time, 267 (13.2%) were part-time, and 108 (5.4%) were unemployed.

Recreation, culture and sport
The Anzac Hall was built in 1916 to give ‘A place of resort, recreation and amusement for all those who are now or have been or may be during the term of the war employed in the military or naval service of the Crown’. A large beautiful wooden hall with two smaller rooms, it was restored for its centennial and is a Category 1 historic place. It now serves as a town hall and community hub, used for concerts, events and meetings.

Lake Wairarapa Domain is a popular recreation area for walks, cycling and motorcycling, plus fishing, birdwatching and exploring the wetlands.

In 2015, Featherston joined the Booktown movement, and hosts an annual literary festival and other bookish events through the year. Other annual events include winter's Time Traveller's Ball, a summer series of Featherston First Friday community arts nights, and the Cross Creek Rail Society's Mini Train Carnival. The Royal Hotel re-opened in December 2017 after extensive renovations, with a steampunk theme allowing them pay homage to the town's literary and historical threads.

Featherston has various sporting clubs including one of the oldest junior football clubs in the country, Featherston Junior FC can trace their club history back to 1856.  Also, there's; a rugby union football club, a hockey club, athletics club, swimming club, football club and an indoor sports complex.

Education

Featherston once had a secondary school, Featherston District High School. It closed in the mid 1960s.

Transport
Featherston is at the junction of State Highway 2 and State Highway 53. SH 2 connects Featherston south to Wellington via the Remutaka Pass and the Hutt Valley, and north to Masterton via Greytown and Carterton and onwards to Woodville. SH 53 connects SH 2 and Featherston with Martinborough.

Featherston is served by Featherston railway station on the Wairarapa Line railway. The Wairarapa Connection train serves Featherston on its route between Masterton and Wellington, operating five times daily each way on weekdays and twice daily each way on weekends and public holidays. The journey time to Wellington station is just over 60 minutes.

Sister cities
Featherston is twinned with the Belgian city of Mesen.

Notable people

Robert Algie, a wrestler from Featherston. He won a silver medal in the heavy-weight division at the Edinburgh Commonwealth Games in 1986, and gold medals at the Oceania Champs in Brisbane in 1981, and Auckland in 1986. Algie placed 12th at the World Championships in France in 1987.
Henry Bunny (1822–1891), MP representing the  electorate 1865–1881.
Raised in Featherston Professor Max Abbott, recipient of the New Zealand 1990 Commemoration Medal, Pro-Vice Chancellor of Auckland University of Technology, former Chairman of Auckland's Waitamata DHB, and president of the World Federation for Mental Health.

References

 
Populated places in the Wellington Region
South Wairarapa District